Nagia episcopalis is a species of moth in the family Erebidae. It is found in Papua New Guinea.

References

Nagia
Moths described in 1926
Moths of New Guinea